Marwari people are business-oriented people from Northern Indian Marwar region who were traders during the era of Rajput kingdoms and later participated in industrialization of India. Today, they own some one of the largest business groups and companies in India.

Following is the list of businesses owned and operated by Marwari families:

A
Aditya Birla Group
Birla Corporation
Grasim Industries
Hindalco Industries
Idea Cellular
UltraTech Cement
ABG Shipyard

B
Bajaj Group
Bajaj Auto
Bajaj Finance
Bajaj Electricals
Mukand
Balkrishna Industries
Big Bazaar

C
Chambal Fertilisers
Cosmo Films
CK Birla Group

D

 DMart

 Dalmia Group

E
Essar Group
Essar Shipping
Essel
Essel Propack
Zee Entertainment Enterprises
Emami

F
Flipkart
Future Group

I
India Infoline
IndiaMART

J
Jindal Steel and Power
JSW Group
JSW Energy
JSW Ispat Steel

K
 KKCL
Kasat Group

L
Lupin Limited
Lenskart
Lodha Group

M
Myntra 
Motilal Oswal group

O
Ola Cabs
OYO Rooms

P
Piramal Group
Paytm

Q

R
Raymond Group
RPG Group
CEAT
CESC Limited
RP-Sanjiv Goenka Group
Runwal Group

S
Shree Cement
Snapdeal
Supreme Industries
Shopclues
shaadi.com
Solar Industries

U
Urban Ladder

V
Vardhman Group of Companies
Vardhman Textiles
Vedanta Resources
Cairn India
Hindustan Zinc
Videocon Group
Videocon Telecom

W
Welspun Group
Welspun Corp
Welspun India

Y
Yebhi
Zomato

References

Marwari people
Marwari
Marwari